Staré Buky is a municipality and village in Trutnov District in the Hradec Králové Region of the Czech Republic. It has about 600 inhabitants.

Administrative parts
Staré Buky is made up of village parts of Dolní Staré Buky, Horní Staré Buky and Prostřední Staré Buky.

Notable people
Adolf Prokop (1939–2002), football referee

References

Villages in Trutnov District